A Queen Is Crowned is a 1953 British Technicolor documentary film written by Christopher Fry. The film documents the 1953 Coronation of Queen Elizabeth II, with a narration of events by Laurence Olivier. It was nominated for the Academy Award for Best Documentary Feature and was the first winner of the now-defunct Golden Globe Award for Best Documentary Film. The film was one of the most popular at the British box office in 1953.

Cast
 Laurence Olivier as Narrator
 Queen Elizabeth II as Herself
 Prince Philip, Duke of Edinburgh as Himself 
 Queen Elizabeth The Queen Mother as Herself 
 Prince Charles as Himself
 Jawaharlal Nehru as Himself

See also
Royal Journey
 Coronation of Queen Elizabeth II

References

External links

1953 films
1953 documentary films
1950s English-language films
British documentary films
Coronation of Elizabeth II
Films about Elizabeth II
Documentary films about British royalty
Films directed by Castleton Knight
Cultural depictions of Jawaharlal Nehru
1950s British films